Said Djauharsjah Jenie (22 August 1950, Surakarta – July 11, 2008, Bandung) was an Indonesian scientist and teacher. He was the head of The Agency for the Assessment and Application of Technology (AAAT) from 2006 until his death in 2008. He was a member of the Board of Commissioners PT. Indonesian Aerospace.

Said Jenie was one of the key figures behind the success of the maiden flight of aircraft N-250, the first commercial aircraft entirely designed and made in Indonesia. He worked as an educator in the Department of Aerospace Engineering ITB (ITB) as Professor Prodi Engineering Flight. Said was a researcher at the Massachusetts Institute of Technology (MIT) and NASA in United States.

Said Jenie died in Bandung Hospital on July 11, 2008 due to heart disease. He was buried in Family Cemetery Sewu, Bantul, Yogyakarta.

Family 
Jenie married Sadarijah with whom he had two daughters, Asih Nurul Sadarijah and Gita Ismailia Isbandiyah. Said Jenie was the son of Jenie Nahar Minangkabau and Isbandiyah.

Education 
He studied mechanical engineering at Bandung Institute of Technology, graduating in 1969. He holds a master's degree in Aeronautics and Astronautics at the Technical University of Delft, Netherlands (1978). He holds a doctorate in astrodynamics in Massachusetts Institute of Technology (MIT), United States (1982)

Career 
 Chief of Flight Test Center N-250 (1995) 
 Deputy Head of BPPT Design Build Industry Technology and Engineering (1998)
 Member of the Board of Commissioners of PT. Indonesian Aerospace (2002)
 Head of the Agency for the Assessment and Application of Technology (2006)
 Head of Sumo Community

Awards 
 ASEAN Engineering Awards (1994)
 Bintang Jasa Utama (2007)

References

External links 
  "Said Jenie and engineering Indonesia", Kompas, July 16, 2008
  "Inaugural Ka BPPT to avoid Overlapping", ristek.go.id, 26 April 2006
 Genealogy Djauharsjah Said Jenie

Indonesian scientists
Indonesian schoolteachers
Bandung Institute of Technology alumni
Minangkabau people
Javanese people
People from Surakarta
1950 births
2008 deaths